Retie is a municipality located in the Campine region of the province of Antwerp, Belgium. The municipality comprises the town of Retie proper and several hamlets of which Schoonbroek is the largest. In 2021, Retie had a total population of 11,582. The total area is 48.39 km2.

The Francophone name of Retie is Rethy.

Famous inhabitants
 Julien Cools (born 1947), footballer
 Lodewijk de Koninck (1838–1924), writer
 Peter van Hove (?–1793), Friar Minor
 Zefa Raeymaekers, (1922–2017), journalist, poet, politician

See also
 Princes Park, Retie, which was also a location in the award-winning tv series Flesh and Bones.

References

External links

Official website

 
Municipalities of Antwerp Province
Populated places in Antwerp Province